Reform Group may refer to:

Reform Group (Finland), a defunct political party in Finland
The Reform Group, an organisation in the Republic of Ireland